Growth differentiation factor 7 (GDF7) is a protein that in humans is encoded by the GDF7 gene.

GDF7 belongs to the transforming growth factor beta superfamily that is specifically found in a signaling center known as the roof plate that is located in the developing nervous system of embryos. The roof plate is required for the generation of several classes of spinal cord dorsal interneurons; GDF7 specifically induces the formation of sensory neurons in the dorsal spinal cord from neural crest cells by generating signals within the roof plate.

GDF7 is also known as bone morphogenic protein 12 (BMP-12).

References

Further reading

Developmental genes and proteins
TGFβ domain